Loisel is a surname. Notable people with the surname include:

Élisabeth Loisel (born 1963), French footballer and manager
Georg Loisel (born 1957), Austrian fencer
Hubert Loisel (1912–1999), Austrian fencer
John S. Loisel (1920–2010), American World War II flying ace
Régis Loisel (born 1951), French comics writer and artist